Lady Helen Olga Hay (née Maitland; born 23 May 1944), usually known as Lady Olga Maitland, is a British Conservative politician and journalist, formerly member of parliament for Sutton and Cheam.

Family and education
The daughter of Patrick Maitland, 17th Earl of Lauderdale, and his wife Stanka (née Losanitch), Maitland was educated at St Mary and St Anne's School, Abbots Bromley, later the Abbots Bromley School for Girls, and the Lycée Français Charles de Gaulle in South Kensington.

Career
Maitland was a reporter for the Fleet Street News Agency and the Blackheath and District Reporter, and a columnist for the Sunday Express (1967–91). In 1983 she was founder and thereafter chairman of Families for Defence, and from 1992 was President of the Defence and Security Forum. In 1998 she became a contributor to the Daily Mail.

In 2005, Lady Olga Maitland launched the Algeria British Business Council (ABBC) in partnership with Arslan Chikhaoui. She is currently the ABBC chairman.

Politics
In the mid-1980s, Maitland formed the campaigning group Women and Families for Defence, which aimed to counter the protests against the deployment of American Cruise missiles on British soil and to oppose the Greenham Common Peace Camp.

In the 1980s, Maitland reported to MI5 that a Russian journalist and spy, Yuri Sagaidak, tried to recruit her. Sagaidak was exposed and sent back to the Soviet Union in 1989.

At the 1987 General Election, Maitland was the Conservative Prospective Parliamentary Candidate at Bethnal Green and Stepney, but was unsuccessful. She subsequently became Member of Parliament for Sutton and Cheam from 1992 to the 1997 General Election, which removed the Conservative Party from government, when she lost to Liberal Democrat Paul Burstow. She unsuccessfully fought the seat again in 2001.

During her time as an MP at Westminster, Maitland was a member of the Parliamentary Select Committees for Education, Health and Procedures, Northern Ireland, and Defence and Foreign Affairs, and was sometime secretary to the Conservative Backbench Committee. She was also a member of the Yugoslav Parliamentary Group. She promoted Private Members Bills in the House of Commons on Prisoner's Return to Custody (1995), and Offensive Weapons (1996), and in 1996–97 was Parliamentary Private Secretary to Sir John Wheeler, then Minister of State for Northern Ireland at the Northern Ireland Office.

Marriage
On 19 April 1969, Maitland married Robin William Patrick Hamilton Hay, M.A., LL.B., a barrister who later became a Crown Court Recorder. They have two sons, Alastair and Fergus, and a daughter, Camilla.

Publications
 Peace Studies in our Schools (1985; contributor)
 Margaret Thatcher: the first ten years (1989)
 Faith in the Family (1997)
 Political Indoctrination in Our Schools.

References

 Times Guide to the House of Commons 1997
 Dewar, Peter Beauclerk, Burke's Landed Gentry of Great Britain - The Kingdom in Scotland, 19th edition, vol.1, 2001, p. 973, 
 Crooks, John, & Green, Alison, editors, Debrett's People of Today 2001, 14th edition, London, p. 1286,

External links

1944 births
Living people
Female members of the Parliament of the United Kingdom for English constituencies
Conservative Party (UK) MPs for English constituencies
UK MPs 1992–1997
Daughters of Scottish earls
People educated at Abbots Bromley School for Girls
People educated at Lycée Français Charles de Gaulle
20th-century British women politicians
20th-century English women
20th-century English people